In the run up to the Italian local elections of 2016, various organisations are carrying out opinion polling to gauge voting intention in Italy. Results of such polls are given in this article.

Poll results
Poll results are listed in the tables below in reverse chronological order, showing the most recent first. The highest percentage figure in each polling survey is displayed in bold, and the background shaded in the leading party's or coalition's colour.

Under the Italian par condicio (equal conditions) law, publication of opinion polls is forbidden in the last two weeks of an electoral campaign.

Bologna

Candidates

First round

Second round
Merola vs. Borgonzoni

Merola vs. Bugani

Merola vs. Bernardini

Parties

Milan

Candidates

First round

Second round

Parties

Naples

Candidates

First round

Second round
De Magistris vs. Lettieri

De Magistris vs. Valente

De Magistris vs. Brambilla

Rome

Candidates

First round

Second round
Giachetti vs. Raggi

Meloni vs. Raggi

Marchini vs. Raggi

Parties

Turin

Candidates

First round

Second round
Fassino vs. Appendino

Fassino vs. Morano

2016
Italy